Glycocystis beckeri is the only species of the flowering plant genus Glycocystis in the family Scrophulariaceae and is endemic to the south west of Western Australia. It is a shrub, similar to others in the genera Eremophila and Myoporum but is unusual in that it produces very large amounts of sticky, sweet-smelling resin produced by raised glands which cover the entire plant, except for the petals. It has been suggested that the resin traps insects which the plant uses as a source of nitrogen.

Description 
The branches are often black due to the presence of fungus. The edges of the leaves are serrated and their surface is covered with large numbers of small, raised resin glands.

There are 5 narrow, pointed sepals which have similar glands to the branches and leaves. There are also 5 petals joined at their bases, forming a bell-shaped tube. The petal tube is white apart from inside the tube and the lower lobe which are white with yellow blotches. There are 4 short stamens which extend slightly beyond the petal tube. Flowering occurs throughout the year, especially after rain and is followed by fruits which are dry and winged when mature.

Taxonomy and naming
Glycocystis beckeri was first formally described in 1859 by Ferdinand von Mueller in Fragmenta phytographiae Australiae as Eremophila beckeri from a specimen collected by George Maxwell in rocky hills near to the Phillips River. The genus name (Glycocystis) is from the Ancient Greek words γλυκύς (glykýs) meaning "sweet" and κύστις (kýstis) meaning "a cyst" or "bladder" referring to the sweet smelling resin produced by the glands on many parts of this species. The specific epithet (beckeri) honours the artist, naturalist and explorer Ludwig Becker.

Distribution and habitat
Glycocystis beckeri occurs near Ravensthorpe in the Esperance Plains and Mallee biogeographic regions. It grows in pebbly clay loam.

Ecology
It has been suggested that the production of large amounts of sweet resin by this plant may be an adaptation to attract and trap insects which may in turn provide the plant with nitrogen in a similar way to that employed by plants in the South African genus Roridula.

Conservation
Glycocystis beckeri is classified as "not threatened" by the Western Australian Government Department of Parks and Wildlife.

References 

Monotypic Lamiales genera
Plants described in 1859
Scrophulariaceae
Endemic flora of Southwest Australia
Scrophulariaceae genera